Melissa María Jiménez Dionisio (born in Lieja, Belgium on 26 June 1987) is a Spanish sports journalist.

Biography 
Melissa Jimenez is the daughter of Antonio Jimenez, (son of Spanish emigrants and born in Granada in 1963) and Luciana Dionisio (Italy). She has a younger sister named Sara. At the age of 2 years old, she moved to Barcelona, since her father was starting to work in the motorcycle world championship under the orders of JJ Cobas.

She grew up in a very small town 60 km from Barcelona and always went to the races with her father whenever she could. Since she was a child she knew she wanted to work in the MotoGP World Championship. She studied Communication Sciences in Barcelona and did an internship at Onda Rambla. She spent two years working both on the radio and in 25TV and after finishing her degree she moved to Madrid, where she began to collaborate with MarcaTV. A year and a half later SKY Italia offered her to broadcast motorcycles with them and she went to Milan, commented some pre-season training sessions and worked as head of press for the "Forward Racing" Moto2 team. In 2013 Mediaset España gave her the opportunity to return to Spain to join their sports newsroom.

In 2013 she joined Mediaset España's motorcycle broadcasting team as a commentator in the paddock, replacing Lara Álvarez. Two years later, Jiménez announced through her Instagram account that she would no longer be part of the Moto GP commentary team.

In October 2016, she participated as a guest on the fifth season of Antena 3's musical program Tu cara me suena, where she stepped into the shoes of Nelly Furtado to sing the song I'm like a bird.

In 2022, she is confirmed to join DAZN F1 to be the reporter at Formula 1 circuits.

Television career 
She began her career in the television channel 25TV and later became part of MarcaTV presenting "Tiramillas", "Marca Motor", "Marca Player" and "Zamoras y Pichichis". Until then she worked for Sky's Italian division as a motor specialist in the program Sysprt24h. In 2012 she was on the verge of signing with Telecinco. The network, in the end, opted for Lara Álvarez and she returned to Sky Italia. There she did the race summaries from the studio. The second call from Telecinco caught her recording a spot with Alex De Angelis Moto2) rider in Italy. From 2013 until 2015 she was a reporter at the foot of the paddock in the MotoGP OF Telecinco, along with Nico Abad., In March 2016 after two years in front of MotoGP, Mediaset España announced the departure of the journalist for the next season.

Personal life 
From June 2013 to February 2014 she was romantically involved with singer Dani Martín.

A few months later she started dating the then FC Barcelona footballer Marc Bartra. On 10 March 2015 they announced that they were expecting their first daughter together. On 18 August 2015 Melissa gives birth to the couple's first child in Barcelona, a girl named Gala Bartra Jiménez.

In June 2016, she moved to live in Dortmund, Germany, due to her then partner's move to Borrussia Dortmund.

On 10 October 2016, the couple announced their engagement through their social networks. On 18 June 2017, they got married in Barcelona.

On 24 December 2017 she announced on her instagram account that she was expecting her second daughter. Abril Bartra Jiménez was born on 25 April 2018 in Seville.

As a result of the 2018 signing of Marc Bartra by Real Betis, melissa Jiménez moves her home to Seville.

On 13 May 2019, they announce through their Instagram account that they are going to be parents for the third time. On 26 October 2019, the couple's third child, Max Bartra Jiménez, was born.

In January 2022, they announced that they had been separated for months and were in the process of separating..

References

External links 
 Melissa Jiménez on Instagram

Spanish television presenters
Sports journalists
Spanish women journalists

Living people
1985 births